Greensted Green is hamlet in the Ongar civil parish of the Epping Forest district, in the English county of Essex.  It is positioned at the western end of Greensted, slightly above 2 miles (4 kilometers) to the west of Chipping Ongar.

Name origin 
The "Green" in the name "Greensted Green"  refers to an area directly to the south of the Greensted road and the east of the Toot Hill road which was fenced off for agricultural use probably towards the end of the nineteenth century.   The south western corner of the former green was for many years a marshy area at the confluence of various drainage ditches, but towards the end of the twentieth century it was dug out and extended, to create a small pond for ducks and (especially in winter) geese.

References 
A-Z Essex, 2010 edition. p. 66.

External links

Hamlets in Essex
Epping Forest District